The Battle of Medina took place in 1812. Following the defeat at the Battle of Al-Safra, Tusun's forces begun to deal with rebel tribes around Medina while military supplies were moved to Yanbu from Egypt. Muhammad Ali Pasha sent Ahmed Pasha with 10,000 men to help Tusun's forces to defend Medina, however this combined army was defeated and the Saudis successfully took the city in November 1812, killing about 600 Ottoman soldiers.

References 

Medina 1812
Medina 1812
Medina
Medina 1812
Medina 1812
History of Medina
November 1812 events